Todd Andrew Smyly  (born June 13, 1989), nicknamed "Big Shooter", is an American professional baseball pitcher for the Chicago Cubs of Major League Baseball (MLB). He has previously played in MLB for the Detroit Tigers, Tampa Bay Rays, Texas Rangers, Philadelphia Phillies, San Francisco Giants, Atlanta Braves and Chicago Cubs.

Prior to his professional career, Smyly played college baseball at the University of Arkansas. He competed for the United States national baseball team, winning the silver medal in the 2011 Pan American Games. The Tigers drafted Smyly in the second round of the 2010 MLB draft. He made his MLB debut in 2012. Smyly was a part of the 2021 World Series champions with the Braves.

Early life
Smyly was born in Little Rock, Arkansas, to parents Todd and Toni, and grew up in Maumelle, Arkansas. He attended Little Rock Central High School in Little Rock, where he established school records on the baseball team for wins (10) and strikeouts (118) in his junior year.

College career

Smyly attended the University of Arkansas, where he played college baseball for the Arkansas Razorbacks baseball team in the Southeastern Conference (SEC) of the National Collegiate Athletic Association (NCAA) Division I. In 2008 he did not play, as he had a fractured left elbow into which two screws were inserted.  As a redshirt freshman in 2009, Smyly came within two outs of pitching the first no-hitter at the NCAA Division I championship tournament in 18 years.

During the summer following his 2009 season, Smyly pitched for the Duluth Huskies of the Northwoods League where he played for a brief time under former New York Mets Manager Terry Collins. Serving in the Razorbacks starting rotation in 2010, Smyly had a 9–1 win-loss record with a 2.80 earned run average (ERA) and 114 strikeouts in 103 innings pitched, and was named All-SEC.

Professional career

Detroit Tigers
The Detroit Tigers drafted Smyly in the second round (68th overall) of the 2010 MLB draft. He signed with the Tigers, receiving a $1.1 million signing bonus. Pitching for the Lakeland Tigers of the Class A-Advanced Florida State League and the Erie SeaWolves of the Class AA Eastern League, Smyly was named the Tigers Minor League Pitcher of the Year in 2011, pitching to an 11–6 win–loss record in 22 games (21 starts) with a 2.07 earned run average (ERA) and 130 strikeouts in 126 innings pitched. He was also FSL Pitcher of the Week on June 13, and an MiLB.com Tigers Organization All-Star.

2012

Heading into the 2012 season, MLB.com ranked Smyly the 82nd-best prospect in baseball, while Baseball America ranked him the third-best prospect in the Tigers organization, behind Jacob Turner and Nick Castellanos. The Tigers invited Smyly to spring training in 2012, allowing him to compete for a spot in the Tigers starting rotation. Smyly won the competition, beginning the 2012 season in the starting rotation of the Detroit Tigers, though he made one start with the Toledo Mud Hens of the Class-AAA International League on April 7 prior to being called up for his MLB debut on April 12. On June 14, he was placed on the disabled list (retroactive to June 11) due to a blister on his left hand. Following the Tigers trade deadline acquisition of starter Aníbal Sánchez from the Miami Marlins, Smyly spent much of August and September coming out of the Tigers bullpen.

On the season, he pitched  innings, compiling a 4–3 record with 94 strikeouts, 33 walks, and a 3.99 ERA. He was named to the Tigers postseason roster.

Smyly was the winning pitcher in Game 1 of the 2012 ALCS against the New York Yankees, pitching the final two innings of the Tigers’ extra-innings win.

2013
Smyly competed with Rick Porcello in spring training for the fifth spot in the Tigers 2013 starting rotation. On March 26, it was announced that Porcello had won the No. 5 starter job, and that Smyly would start the season in the Tiger bullpen. On April 5, Smyly got his first career save after pitching four perfect innings of relief in an 8–3 win over the Yankees. In his first full season as a reliever, Smyly posted a 6–0 record with 2 saves in 63 games with a 2.37 ERA. He led all Tigers relievers and all AL lefty relievers in innings pitched (76) and strikeouts (81).

2014
With the departure of Tigers starter Doug Fister via trade, he was named the No. 5 starter in the Tigers rotation for the 2014 season.  Because of off days, he pitched six innings out of the bullpen before making his season debut as a starter on April 18. He pitched seven shutout innings to earn the win in a May 3 game against the Kansas City Royals. This marked his first win as a starter since July 6, 2012, which also came against Kansas City. On July 25, in a game against the Los Angeles Angels of Anaheim, Smyly matched his season high in strikeouts (8) after just three innings, and finished the game with a career-high 11 strikeouts in  innings.

Tampa Bay Rays

On July 31, 2014, the Detroit Tigers traded Smyly to the Tampa Bay Rays, along with Willy Adames, in a three-team deal that also sent Austin Jackson to the Seattle Mariners, Nick Franklin from the Mariners to the Rays, and David Price to the Tigers. On September 9, Rays' manager Joe Maddon announced they would shut down Smyly for the remainder of the season, after he had pitched a career-high 153 innings. After being traded to the Rays, Smyly went 3–1 with a 1.70 ERA in seven starts. Opponents hit .155 against him, a figure that led the AL over that span. For the 2014 season he was 9–10 with a 3.24 ERA in 28 games, 25 of which were starts.

In 2015 he was 5–2 with a 3.11 ERA in 12 starts, as he struck out 77 batters in  innings.

On February 4, 2016, Smyly won his arbitration case against the Rays. He earned $3.75 million in 2016. In 2016 he was 7–12 with a 4.88 ERA in 30 starts in which he pitched  innings. The 32 home runs he gave up were fifth-most in the American League.

Seattle Mariners
On January 11, 2017, the Rays traded Smyly to the Seattle Mariners for Mallex Smith, Ryan Yarbrough, and Carlos Vargas. Smyly began the season on the disabled list. On June 28, the team announced Smyly would need Tommy John surgery for a torn left elbow  ulnar collateral ligament, which he had the following month, ending his season with Seattle without him having started a game.

Chicago Cubs
On December 12, 2017, Smyly signed a two-year, $10 million deal with the Chicago Cubs. During the 2018 season, after recovering from his surgery Smyly made a single appearance in the minor leagues, pitching one inning for the Class A South Bend Cubs, striking out three.

Texas Rangers

On November 2, 2018, the Cubs traded Smyly and a player to be named later to the Texas Rangers in exchange for a player to be named later. He was placed on the disabled list on April 20 with a left arm injury. On June 20, he was designated for assignment. On June 25, he was released by Texas. For the portion of the 2019 season that he pitched for Texas, he was 1–5 with an 8.42 ERA in 13 games, 9 of which were starts, as he struck out 52 batters in  innings.

Milwaukee Brewers
On July 1, 2019, Smyly signed a minor league deal with the Milwaukee Brewers. Starting three games for the AAA San Antonio Missions, he was 1–0 with a 4.97 ERA with 18 strikeouts in  innings. He elected free agency on July 18.

Philadelphia Phillies
On July 21, 2019, Smyly signed a major league contract with the Philadelphia Phillies. With the Phillies he was 3–2 with a 4.45 ERA, as in 12 starts, he pitched  innings and struck out 68 batters; the 32 home runs he gave up for the season between Texas and Philadelphia were the 10th-most in the major leagues.

San Francisco Giants
On January 16, 2020, Smyly signed a one-year deal with the San Francisco Giants. On the shortened season, Smyly pitched in 7 games (5 starts) with a record of 0–1 in  innings.

Atlanta Braves
On November 16, 2020, Smyly signed a one-year contract worth $11 million with the Atlanta Braves. In 2021 he was 11–4 with a 4.48 ERA. The Braves finished with an 88–73 record, clinching the NL East, and eventually won the 2021 World Series, giving the Braves their first title since 1995.

Chicago Cubs (second stint)
On March 19, 2022, Smyly and the Chicago Cubs agreed to a contract worth $4.25 million for the 2022 season. Smyly finished the 2022 season with a 7-8 record and a 3.47 ERA in 22 starts for the Cubs. He became a free agent after the season. On December 24, 2022, Smyly re-signed with the Cubs on a two-year, $19 million contract with an opt-out clause after the 2023 season and a mutual option for the 2025 season.

International career
After the 2011 season, Smyly pitched for the United States national baseball team in the 2011 Baseball World Cup and the 2011 Pan American Games, winning the silver medal. Smyly also pitched for Team USA in the 2017 World Baseball Classic.

Pitching style
Smyly throws four pitches. His main pitch is a four-seam fastball at 91 mph, known for the fact that it explodes on the hitter. He adds a curveball at 77 with little depth. He has a cut fastball around 87, which has drawn praise for its late, darting movement into right-handed hitters and away from lefties. Since 2014, he has re-added a changeup in the 83 mph range that he throws almost exclusively to right-handed hitters. He will also mix in a slider (83–85) on occasion.

In 2020，his four-seam averaged nearly 94 mph, at 2249 rpm while his curveball also increased to 80 mph average at 2153 rpm compared to 1950 rpm in 2019. The improvements were due to his longer arm swing, higher glove position off the raised front thigh at windup, and a faster arm speed at release, but also having well-recovered from Tommy John surgery.

Personal
Smyly and his wife, Eryn, had a daughter in 2017. They reside in Scottsdale, Arizona.

See also

List of baseball players who underwent Tommy John surgery

References

External links

1989 births
Living people
Arkansas Razorbacks baseball players
Atlanta Braves players
Baseball players at the 2011 Pan American Games
Baseball players from Arkansas
Chicago Cubs players
Detroit Tigers players
Erie SeaWolves players
Lakeland Flying Tigers players
Little Rock Central High School alumni
Major League Baseball pitchers
Medalists at the 2011 Pan American Games
Pan American Games medalists in baseball
Pan American Games silver medalists for the United States
People from Maumelle, Arkansas
Philadelphia Phillies players
San Antonio Missions players
San Francisco Giants players
South Bend Cubs players
Tampa Bay Rays players
Texas Rangers players
Toledo Mud Hens players
World Baseball Classic players of the United States
2017 World Baseball Classic players
Duluth Huskies players